The rose danio (Danio roseus) is a tropical fish of the family Cyprinidae. At first glance, this species resembles the pearl danio, but lacks the orange stripe on the side. It has a rosy colouration along the lower part of the fish and lower fins and gleams purple-blue in sunlight. It is also commonly known as the purple passion danio.  Its natural range includes the Mekong River drainage in China, Thailand. Laos, and Myanmar.

 Maximum length: 1.25 inches 3.175 cm
 Colors: Blue, purple, silver, red
 Temperature preference 20-25 °C
 pH preference: 6 to 7
 Hardness preference: Soft to medium
 Salinity preference: Low to medium
 Compatibility: Peaceful but fast, like most danios; needs plenty of space to swim; a good "dither" fish (draws timid fish out of hiding)
 Lifespan: Typically two to three years
 Ease of keeping: Moderate
 Ease of breeding: Moderate to easy

References

Fish of Thailand
Danio
Fish described in 2000